is a Japanese football manager and former player who is currently the head coach of the Uzbekistan national team. As a player, Honda played for Japan national team.

Club career
Honda was born in Shizuoka on 16 November 1964. She played for her local club Shimizudaihachi SC. She won Empress's Cup for 4 years in a row (1980-1983). In 1985, she moved to Yomiuri Nippon SC Ladies Beleza. The club won L.League for 3 years in a row (1990-1992). She was selected Best Eleven in 1990 season.

National team career
In June 1981, when Honda was 16 years old, she was selected Japan national team for 1981 AFC Championship. At this competition, on 7 June, she debuted against Chinese Taipei. This match is Japan team first match in International A Match. She also played at 1986, 1989, 1991 AFC Championship and 1990 Asian Games. She was also a member of Japan national team for 1991 World Cup. This competition was her last game for Japan. She played 43 games for Japan until 1991.

Coaching career
In 2001, Honda became manager for new club Okayama Yunogo Belle. She instructed international players, Aya Miyama, Miho Fukumoto and so on. End of 2010 season, she resigned. In 2013, she became manager for AC Nagano Parceiro.

In February 2022, Honda became the head coach of the Uzbekistan women's national football team.

National team statistics

References

External links
 

 Profile

1964 births
Living people
Kokushikan University alumni
Association football people from Shizuoka Prefecture
Japanese women's footballers
Japan women's international footballers
Nadeshiko League players
Shimizudaihachi Pleiades players
Nippon TV Tokyo Verdy Beleza players
Japanese women's football managers
1991 FIFA Women's World Cup players
Women's association football defenders
Asian Games silver medalists for Japan
Asian Games medalists in football
Footballers at the 1990 Asian Games
Medalists at the 1990 Asian Games